Whitin can refer to
James Whitin (1814–1902), youngest son of Paul C. Whitin
Paul Whitin (1767–1831), American blacksmith
Sarah Elizabeth Whitin, benefactor of the astronomical observatory owned and operated by Wellesley College
Thomson M. Whitin (born 1923), American management scientist

See also 
Whitin Machine Works
Whitin Observatory
Whitinsville, Massachusetts
Whiting (disambiguation)